Evangelia Platanioti (born 9 August 1994) is a Greek artistic swimmer. She competed in the women's duet at the 2012 Summer Olympics. She also competed at the 2016 Summer Olympics in the women's duet where her partner was Evangelia Papazoglou. They finished in 10th place.

Career
In 2018, Platanioti and Papazoglou finished in 6th place in the duet technical routine at the 2018 European Aquatics Championships. In the duet free routine they finished in 5th place.

Between 2017 and 2022, she has won 9 medals (1 gold, 4 silver and 4 bronze) in FINA Artistic Swimming World Series.

In May 2021, she won two medals (1 silver and 1 bronze) at the 2020 European Championships in both Solo technical and Solo free held in Budapest, Hungary. She is the first-ever Greek artistic swimmer to claim 2 medals in the same European Championships.

Shortly before the 2020 Summer Olympics, she was tested positive for COVID-19 but after few days, she tested negative and she made it through Tokyo to compete in the Games. However, few hours after her Duet Technical performance, more cases were announced within the Greek artistic swimming team which resulted in the withdrawal of the entire team from the Games.

In June 2022, she won two bronze medals in both Solo technical and Solo free at the 2022 World Championships held in Budapest, Hungary. She is the first-ever Greek artistic swimmer to win a medal in the World Championships and to claim 2 medals in the same World Championships.

References

External links

1994 births
Living people
Swimmers from Athens
Greek synchronized swimmers
Olympic synchronized swimmers of Greece
Synchronized swimmers at the 2012 Summer Olympics
Synchronized swimmers at the 2016 Summer Olympics
Synchronized swimmers at the 2020 Summer Olympics
Synchronized swimmers at the 2015 World Aquatics Championships
Synchronized swimmers at the 2011 World Aquatics Championships
Synchronized swimmers at the 2013 World Aquatics Championships
Synchronized swimmers at the 2017 World Aquatics Championships
Artistic swimmers at the 2019 World Aquatics Championships
Artistic swimmers at the 2022 World Aquatics Championships
World Aquatics Championships medalists in synchronised swimming
20th-century Greek women
21st-century Greek women